Oscar Funcke (17 June 1885 – 6 July 1965) was a German politician of the Free Democratic Party (FDP) and former member of the German Bundestag.

Life 
Funcke entered the German Bundestag on 14 September 1951, when he succeeded Hermann Höpker-Aschoff as the first president of the Federal Constitutional Court. From 26 February 1953, he was deputy chairman of the Advisory Council for Trade Policy Agreements of the Bundestag. He was a member of parliament until the end of the first legislative period.

Literature

References

1885 births
1965 deaths
Members of the Bundestag for North Rhine-Westphalia
Members of the Bundestag 1949–1953
Members of the Bundestag for the Free Democratic Party (Germany)